Mordellistena glipodoides is a beetle in the genus Mordellistena of the family Mordellidae. It was described in 1931 by Blair.

References

glipodoides
Beetles described in 1931